S.O.S. Noronha is a French adventure film from 1957, directed by Georges Rouquier, written by Pierre Boileau, starring Jean Marais. The scenario was based on a novel of Pierre Viré.

Cast 
 Jean Marais: Frédéric Coulibaud
 Daniel Ivernel: Mastic
 Yves Massard: Froment
 Vanja Orico: Vanja
 José Lewgoy: Pratinho
 Ruy Guerra:  Miguel
 Altit: Santaremi
 Mario Bernardi: Le gouverneur
 Alina de Lima: La femme du gouverneur

References

External links 
 
 S.O.S. Noronha (1957) at the Films de France

1957 films
French adventure films
1950s French-language films
French black-and-white films
Films directed by Georges Rouquier
1957 drama films
Films based on French novels
Films set in Brazil
1950s French films